E pluribus unum (Latin for Out of Many, One) is a Latin phrase on the great seal of the United States.

E pluribus unum may also refer to:

 E Pluribus Unum (album), a 1969 album by Sandy Bull
 É Pluribus Unum, a 2007 album by Mode 9
 E pluribus unum, a song by Supernaut from the 2000 album Raj na nebu, pakao na Zemlji
 E-Pluribus-Unum, a song by Material from the 1991 album The Third Power
 E Pluribus Unum, a 1917 march by Fred Jewell
 E Pluribus Unum (Wilson), a public artwork proposed by Fred Wilson in 2011
 E Pluribus Unum, an essay from the 1984 book The Subatomic Monster by Isaac Asimov
 E Pluribus Unum, a 1982 sculpture by Eli Marozzi
 E Pluribus Unum, an 1866 story by Fitz Hugh Ludlow
 E Pluribus Unum, a poem by George Washington Cutter
 E Pluribus Unum, an episode of Madam Secretary (season 5)
 E Pluribus Unum, an episode of Stranger Things (season 3)

See also
 Out of Many...One, a 2006 album by Tami Chynn
 "E Peterbus Unum", an episode of the animated series Family Guy
 One out of many (disambiguation)
 Unum (disambiguation)